The following lists events that happened during 1840 in Australia.

Incumbents

Governors
Governors of the Australian colonies:
Governor of New South Wales – Sir George Gipps
Governor of South Australia – Lieutenant Colonel George Gawler
Governor of Tasmania – Captain Sir John Franklin
Governor of Western Australia as a Crown Colony – John Hutt

Events
 3 January – The Melbourne newspaper The Herald is founded by George Cavenagh as The Port Phillip Herald.
 May – British Government agrees to cease sending convicts to New South Wales, some 80,000 convicts had been sent since 1788. Convicts still sent to Van Diemen's Land and Port Phillip District colonies.
 25 August – two Ngarrindjeri men are publicly hung along the Coorong in front of their tribe after being accused of the murders of all 26 crew and passengers of the Maria shipwreck. The two men had been convicted in a drumhead court-martial with Major Thomas O'Halloran, South Australian Police Commissioner, presiding and passing sentence.
 2 November – Construction of The Causeway across the Swan River in Perth begins.
 Sydney City Council and Adelaide City Council are incorporated. A ratepayer required £1,000 worth of property to stand for election.

Births

 3 February – Allan McLean, 19th Premier of Victoria (d. 1911)
 11 March – Ralph Tate, botanist and geologist (born in the United Kingdom) (d. 1901)
 26 April – Paddy Hannan, prospector (born in Ireland) (d. 1925)
 23 May – George Throssell, 2nd Premier of Western Australia (d. 1910)
 4 November – William Giblin, 13th Premier of Tasmania (d. 1887)
 8 December – William Guilfoyle, landscape gardener and botanist (d. 1912)
 Unknown – Tommy Windich, explorer (d. 1876)

Deaths

 28 January – Simeon Lord, merchant and magistrate (born in the United Kingdom) (b. 1771)
 17 November – Henry Fulton, chaplain and writer (born in Ireland) (b. 1761)
 24 December – Thomas Moore, settler (born in the United Kingdom) (b. 1762)

References

 
Australia
Years of the 19th century in Australia